Jin Ziwei (born 17 October 1985 in Fengcheng, Dandong, Liaoning) is a female Chinese rower. She competed for Team China at the 2008 Summer Olympics, winning the gold medal as part of the Chinese women's quadruple sculls with Tang Bin, Xi Aihua and Zhang Yangyang.

Major performances
2005 National Games – 1st double sculls
2007 World Championships – 3rd quadruple sculls

References
 http://2008teamchina.olympic.cn/index.php/personview/personsen/336 

1985 births
Living people
Olympic gold medalists for China
Olympic rowers of China
Sportspeople from Dandong
Rowers at the 2008 Summer Olympics
Rowers at the 2012 Summer Olympics
Olympic medalists in rowing
Chinese female rowers
Asian Games medalists in rowing
Medalists at the 2008 Summer Olympics
Rowers at the 2006 Asian Games
Rowers at the 2010 Asian Games
Rowers at the 2004 Summer Olympics
World Rowing Championships medalists for China
Asian Games gold medalists for China
Medalists at the 2006 Asian Games
Medalists at the 2010 Asian Games
Rowers from Liaoning
21st-century Chinese women